Drepanidotaenia is a genus of tapeworms belonging to the family Hymenolepididae.

The genus has almost cosmopolitan distribution.

Species:

Drepanidotaenia bisacculina 
Drepanidotaenia czaplinskii 
Drepanidotaenia lanceolata

References

Cestoda